Cacotherapia lecerfialis is a species of snout moth in the genus Cacotherapia. It was described by William Barnes and Foster Hendrickson Benjamin in 1925 and is known from the US state of California.

References

Cacotherapiini
Moths described in 1925